Somerville is a Scottish surname of Norman origin.

Derivation
Also for years the origin of the name was quoted from the book of surnames of Scotland, a copy did exist in the library of the University of Abertay in Dundee, stating the name originating from Caen or possibly from the commune of Sémerville (Semervilla 1209), near Évreux, that is 141 miles from Caen. However, there are other possibilities, first of all a disappeared place name of Cotentin Sumelleville (Summerleevilla ab 1210) closer to Caen. Other hypothesis like Sommervieu (Sommerveium 1241), 18,5 miles from Caen, were proposed.

History
In 1066 the Lord of Somerville, Sir Gaultier / Walter de Somerville joined William the conqueror on his invasion of England, for his support Sir Gaultier de Somerville was given land in the North of England. By the twelfth century, the Somervilles were granted land and title of lord in Scotland and were at one time among the noble families of Scotland. Alternatively, Somerville can also be a Scottish clan surname.

The Irish House of Somerville began when William Somerville came to Ireland in 1690. William was an Episcopalian minister forced to flee from his manse when it was attacked by Covenanters. William brought his sons William and Thomas with him to Ireland. While the younger William returned to Scotland, his brother Thomas stayed in Ireland. Thomas would be educated at Trinity College in Dublin eventually earning a BA in 1711. He entered the church of his father and was ordained a minister at Cloyne Cathedral in 1715. It was in 1732 that Thomas was made the rector of Myross and Castlehaven. It was his son Thomas who by becoming a very successful merchant with Newfoundland and the West Indies was able to build up the Irish house of Somerville to the ranks of landed gentry a class out of which the Somerville clan had dropped for five generations.

People
The following people have the surname Somerville (or the variant Somervile):

Amanda Somerville (b. 1979), American pop, metal singer
Annis Somerville, New Zealand judge
Alexander Somerville (1811–1885), Scottish journalist and soldier
Alexander Neill Somerville, Scottish minister and evangelist
Annesley Somerville (1858–1942), British politician
Bonnie Somerville (b. 1974), American actress
Carla Somerville (b. 1973), Canadian field hockey player
Daniel Somerville (1879–1938), British politician
Dave Somerville (1933–2015), Canadian singer
Ed Somerville (1853–1877), American baseball player
Edith Anna Somerville (1858–1949), Irish novelist
Geraldine Somerville (b. 1967), Irish-born British actress
Greg Somerville, NZ rugby player
Henry Boyle Townshend Somerville (1863–1936), brother of Edith, sailor, antiquarian, anthropologist, killed by the IRA
James Somerville (Bruce County politician) (1826–1898), Canadian businessperson, notary and Member of Parliament (Bruce West electoral district)
James Somerville (Wentworth County, Ontario politician) (1834–1916), Canadian journalist, editor and Member of Parliament (Brant North, Wentworth North and Brant electoral districts)
James Somerville (admiral) (1882–1949), British admiral during World War II
James Dugald Somerville, best known as J. D. Somerville, Scottish-Australian historian
Jason Somerville, American professional poker player
Jimmy Somerville (b. 1961), Scottish pop singer
John Somerville (1939–1984), Australian rules footballer with Essendon (1960–1967)
John Somerville, Scottish football player and manager
Julia Somerville (b. 1947), ITN newsreader
Lord Somerville, any of a family of Scottish peers
Margaret Somerville (b. 1942), Canadian ethicist
Mary Somerville (1780–1872), Scottish scientific writer, after whom Somerville College is named
Peggy Somerville (1918–1975), British Impressionist painter
Peter Somerville (b. 1968), Australian rules footballer
Phyllis Somerville (1943–2020), American actress
Reginald Somerville 1867–1948, English composer and actor
Richard Somerville (b. 1941), American climatologist
Robert Somerville (b. 1940), American historian of Christianity
Robert Brown Somerville (1812–1904), Scottish-born merchant and politician in Quebec
Ross Somerville (1903–1991), Canadian golfer
Shirley-Anne Somerville (b. 1974), Scottish politician
Wesley Somerville (c.1941–1975), Northern Irish loyalist paramilitary
Thomas David Somerville (b. 1915), former Bishop of the Diocese of New Westminster
William Lyon Somerville (1886–1965), Canadian architect
William Somervile (1675–1742), English poet (Somerville is alternate surname spelling)
William Somerville (disambiguation), several people

See also
 Somerville (disambiguation)
 Sommerville (disambiguation)

References

Scottish surnames

de:Somerville
eo:Somerville
fr:Somerville